William Woodward (birth and death dates unknown) was an American politician who served as a U.S. Representative from South Carolina.

Woodward served as member of the State house of representatives from 1818 to 1823. He was elected as a Democratic-Republican to the Fourteenth Congress (March 4, 1815 – March 3, 1817).

Woodward was a slave owner.

He was father of Joseph A. Woodward.

Sources

Year of birth unknown
Year of death unknown
Democratic-Republican Party members of the United States House of Representatives from South Carolina